Skogn is a former municipality in the old Nord-Trøndelag county, Norway. The  municipality existed from 1838 until its dissolution in 1962. The municipality was located to the south and southwest of the town of Levanger in what is now Levanger municipality in Trøndelag county. The administrative centre was the village of Skogn.

History
The prestegjeld of Skogn was established as a municipality on 1 January 1838 (see formannskapsdistrikt). On 28 November 1874, a royal resolution moved two uninhabited parts of Skogn to the neighboring municipality of Levanger landsogn.

During the 1960s, there were many municipal mergers across Norway due to the work of the Schei Committee. On 1 January 1962, the town of Levanger (population: 1,669) was merged with the neighboring municipalities of Frol (population: 3,774), Åsen (population: 1,939), and Skogn (population: 4,756) to form a new, larger municipality called Levanger.

Name
The municipality (originally the parish) is named after the old name for the area. The name comes from the word  which means "beautiful" or "lovely" (similar to the German word ).

Government
While it existed, this municipality was responsible for primary education (through 10th grade), outpatient health services, senior citizen services, unemployment, social services, zoning, economic development, and municipal roads. During its existence, this municipality was governed by a municipal council of elected representatives, which in turn elected a mayor.

Mayors
The mayors of Skogn:

 1838–1839: Rasmus Hansen 
 1840–1843: Johannes Mathias Sejersted
 1844–1847: Rasmus Hansen
 1848-1849: unknown		
 1850–1851: Peder Isachsen Major 
 1852–1861: Peter Andreas Sæther 
 1862–1867: Olai Olsen 
 1868–1869: K. Holther 		
 1870–1873: Peter Andreas Sæther 
 1874–1875: Olai Olsen 
 1876–1877: Per Hojem 		
 1878–1879: H.P. Schaufel 
 1880–1889: Andreas Høe (V)
 1890–1901: Gustav Jermstad (V)
 1902–1910: Johan Arnt Næsgaard (V)
 1911–1913: Lars Solstad (V)
 1914–1915: Severin Hellem (V)
 1915–1916: Johan Ludvik Bjørgum 
 1917–1919: Ove Storaunet (Ap)
 1920–1925: Gunnar Nestgaard (Bp)
 1926–1934: Ragnvald Stavrum (Bp)
 1935–1941: Gunvald Nesgård (Bp)
 1941–1945: Svend Gilstad (NS)
 1945-1945: Gunvald Nesgård (Bp)
 1946–1947: Olaf Løvli (Ap)
 1948–1951: Einar Fostad (Bp)
 1952–1955: Odin Vist (Ap)
 1956–1959: Johan Holan (Sp)
 1960-1960: Kristen Fostad (Sp)
 1961-1961: Odin Vist (Ap)

Municipal council
The municipal council  of Skogn was made up of representatives that were elected to four year terms. The party breakdown of the final municipal council was as follows:

See also
List of former municipalities of Norway

References

Levanger
Former municipalities of Norway
1838 establishments in Norway
1962 disestablishments in Norway